Jackson Parish School Board is a school district headquartered in Jonesboro, Louisiana, United States. The district serves Jackson Parish.

In the 2012–2013 school year, Jackson Parish public schools had the fifth-highest rate of improvement statewide in the annual end-of-course examinations administered in Algebra I and English II.

School uniforms
All district students are required to wear school uniforms.

Schools

PreK–12 schools
 Quitman High School (Quitman)
 Weston High School (Unincorporated area)

9–12 schools
 Jonesboro-Hodge High School (Jonesboro)

5–8 schools
 Jonesboro-Hodge Middle School (Jonesboro)

PreK–4 schools
 Southside Elementary School (Jonesboro)

References

External links
 Jackson Parish School Board

School districts in Louisiana
School Board